Frank Street may refer to:
 Frank Street (cricketer), English cricketer
 Frank Street Jr., American chess player